Farhad Italmazov (born 19 April 1993) is a Turkmen footballer who plays for Turkmen club Şagadam FK. He was part of the Turkmenistan national team from 2014.

Club career 
He began his professional career in 2012 in FC Lebap. In 2013 played in FC Merw. In 2014, he moved to the FC Ahal.

International career 
Italmazow made his senior national team debut on 20 May 2014, in an 2014 AFC Challenge Cup match against Laos.

He played for Turkmenistan youth team in Commonwealth of Independent States Cup 2012, 2013.

References

External links
 

1993 births
Living people
Turkmenistan footballers
Turkmenistan international footballers
Association football utility players
Association football defenders
Association football forwards